John Buonavoglia is an Australian soccer player who played in the National Soccer League (NSL) and the A-League.

References

1975 births
Living people
Italian emigrants to Australia
A-League Men players
National Soccer League (Australia) players
Australian soccer players
Parramatta Power players
Sydney Olympic FC players
Sydney FC players
Naturalised citizens of Australia
Association football forwards